Three Color Fantasy is a South Korean Three-color drama trilogy by MBC and Naver consisting of three mini television series The Universe's Star (White), Romance Full of Life (Green) and Queen of the Ring (Gold). The dramas started airing on Naver TV Cast every Tuesday at midnight starting on January 24 and on MBC every Thursday at 23:10 (KST) starting on January 26, 2017.

Parts

Production 
The drama trilogy was entirely pre-produced and co-produced between Naver and iMBC.

The Universe's Star was written and directed by Kim Ji-hyun who is known for Splash Splash Love, which won an award at the 20th AsiaTV Awards as the best short drama.

Romance Full of Life marks the directing debut of the director Park Sang-hoon and his second work after directing the movie A Mere Life. The screenwriter Park Eun-young is known for his drama Hwarang: The Poet Warrior Youth.

Queen of the Ring's director Kwon Sung-chan is known for his drama One More Happy Ending, and the drama is the second work for the screenwriter Kim A-jung, after writing the scenario for Divorce Lawyer in Love drama.

The first script reading for the dramas took place in September and in October at MBC Broadcasting Station in Sangam, South Korea.

Ratings 
 In the table below, the blue numbers represent the lowest ratings and the red numbers represent the highest ratings.
 NR denotes that the drama did not rank in the top 20 daily programs on that date.

References 

2017 South Korean television series debuts
MBC TV television dramas
South Korean romantic fantasy television series
Korean-language television shows
Naver TV original programming
2017 South Korean television series endings